The 1955 Bulgarian Cup was the 15th season of the Bulgarian Cup (in this period the tournament was named Cup of the Soviet Army). The tournament started on 16 October 1955 and ended on 11 December with the final. CSKA Sofia won the competition, beating Spartak Plovdiv 5–2 after extra time in the final at the Vasil Levski National Stadium in Sofia.

First round

|}

Second round

|}

Quarter-finals

|-
!colspan="3" style="background-color:#D0F0C0; text-align:left;" |Replay

|-
!colspan="3" style="background-color:#D0F0C0; text-align:left;" |Second replay

|}

Semi-finals

|}

Final

Details

References

1955
1954–55 domestic association football cups
Cup